Liaoxisaurus is a genus of choristodere, a type of crocodile-like aquatic reptile.  It is known from a partial specimen found in Aptian-age Lower Cretaceous rocks of the Jiufotang Formation, Chaoyang, Liaoning, China.  Liaoxisaurus was named in 2005 by Gao Chunling, Lü Junchang, and colleagues.  The type species is L. chaoyangensis.

References

Prehistoric reptile genera
Cretaceous choristoderes
Early Cretaceous reptiles of Asia
Aquatic reptiles
Taxa named by Lü Junchang
Jiufotang fauna